Sinister Beings (Chinese: 逆天奇案) is a 2021 Hong Kong crime television drama produced by Television Broadcasts Limited (TVB), starring Ruco Chan, Ben Wong, Rosina Lam, Crystal Fung as the main leads.

Sinister Beings was the highest rated TVB drama broadcast in 2021. On 10 February 2022, producer Lau Ka-ho announced that a sequel is scheduled to begin filming in mid-October 2022.

Synopsis
Hui Chun-sum (played by Ruco Chan) is an elite in the Organised Crime and Triad Bureau, but he aims to join the Special  Duties Unit; while Sum Wai-lik (played by Ben Wong) is another elite in the Organised Crime and Triad Bureau.

However, the police force is attacked by terrorists, causing severe casualties. Chun-sam gives up his dream of joining the Special Duties Unit and stays in the Organised Crime and Triad Bureau. Chun-sam and Wai-lik work together to fight battles of wits with criminals to solve complex cases.

Cast and Characters

Main Cast

Supporting Cast
Joseph Lee as  Mok Chun-pong (莫振邦), better known as  Mok Sir , a Senior Superintendent of the Organised Crime and Triad Bureau, Sam Sir and Nic Sir's superior.
Gabriel Harrison as  Ku Shing-kwan (古成鈞), better known as  Ku Sir , a Senior Inspector of CIB and Wing's superior.
Lee Shing-cheong as  Ngai Tung-hoi (魏東海), the chairman of “Ngai Fung Group” and Calvin's father. He is Marco's uncle who had been on bad terms with him, and was forced to step down by him in Ep. 19. He was fired in Ep. 24 and killed in Ep. 25.
Bond Chan as  Calvin Ngai Siu-yeung (魏兆揚), the vice chairman of “Ngai Fung Group” and Ngai Tung-hoi's son. He is Marco's cousin who had been on bad terms with him. He was fired in Ep. 24.
Li Lung-kay as  Sum Wang-fuk (沈宏福), Nic Sir's father.

Special Appearance
Chin Siu-ho as  Cheung Yiu-kei (張耀祈), Ana's foster father. He was a Chief Inspector of Police of the SDU and was killed in Ep. 1 during operation. (Ep. 1)
Nina Paw as a grandmother suffering from Dementia. (Ep. 7)
Ken Hung, a murderer. (Ep.11-12)
Mat Yeung as  Kwok Ho (郭皓), a member of a triad, who was in fact a police undercover. Blackmailed triad boss to pay off his gambling debt. He was killed in Ep. 14. (Ep. 13–14)
JW Wong as  Pui-yee  (佩儀), Kwok Ho's ex-girlfriend. (Ep. 14)
FAMA (Ep. 15)
Candy Lo as Marco's deceased mother. She committed suicide due to her husband's affairs when Marco was young. (Ep. 20)
Michelle Yim as a Thai Chinese.
Law Lan as Sung Tat's grandmother who committed suicide after her grandson's death.
Bob Cheung as Sung Tat (宋達), Rachel's deceased boyfriend.

References

2020s Hong Kong television series
2020s Hong Kong television series debuts
2020s crime drama television series
TVB original programming
TVB dramas